Timbellus emilyae is a species of sea snail, a marine gastropod mollusk in the family Muricidae, the murex snails or rock snails.

Distribution
This marine species occurs off Cuba.

References

 Espinosa J. & Ortea J. (2016). Nuevas especies cubanas de la familia Muricidae (Mollusca: Neogastropoda), con aclaraciones sobre otros taxones ya citados para Cuba. Revista de la Academia Canaria de Ciencias. 28: 171-194

External links
 Espinosa, J.; Ortea, J.; Fernandez-Garcés, R.; Moro, L. (2007). Adiciones a la fauna de moluscos marinos de la peninsula de Guanahacabibes (I), con la descripcion de nuevas especies. Avicennia. 19, 63-88

Muricidae
Gastropods described in 2007